DeAnne Smith (born July 22, 1979) is a Canadian-American comedian, writer and columnist. They first gained notice as a comedian in 2008 touring their debut full-length solo stand-up show to popular and critical acclaim, culminating in winning the Sydney Comedy Festival's Time Out Best Newcomer Award and a nomination for Best Newcomer in the 2008 Canadian Comedy Awards. Smith has since continued to tour internationally, with shows proving to be both commercial and critical successes. Their shows have seen them nominated for numerous awards, including the Melbourne Comedy Festival's prestigious Barry Award in 2011 and being consistently rated amongst Montreal's Top 10 comedians. In addition to their live solo shows, Smith is also known for appearances on television and radio, most notably on Australia's Good News Week on the Channel 10 network and HBO series Funny As Hell.

Smith began performing stand-up in 2005 at the age of 25, and has produced four solo shows which have toured internationally. Smith has also created and hosts four live comedy show series in Montreal, and co-wrote a show with Sarah Quinn and Samuel Booth which made its festival debut in 2011.

Smith uses they/them pronouns.

Career

Festival appearances 
 2011, 2012 – Edinburgh Fringe Festival; Edinburgh
 2007, 2009, 2010, 2011, 2012, 2013, 2014 – Just for Laughs; Montreal
 2010, 2011, 2012, 2013 – Melbourne International Comedy Festival
 2009, 2010, 2011, 2012 – Melbourne International Comedy Festival Roadshow
 2008, 2009, 2010, 2011, 2012 – Sydney Comedy Festival
 2008, 2009, 2010, 2011, 2012, 2013 – Adelaide Fringe Festival
 2012 – Perth International Comedy Festival; Perth
 2012 – Brisbane Comedy Festival; Brisbane
 2010 – Hobart Comedy Festival

Media appearances 
Smith has been rated amongst Montreal's Top 10 Comedians over the past five years, ranking #3 in 2010–2012, and #4 from 2007–2009. 
 as reported in The Montreal Mirror, which also named them a Noisemaker in 2009. Smith regularly appears on television and radio in Canada and Australia. Their radio appearances, include Australia's ABC, Triple J, and Canada's CBC Radio One, where they have appeared as a regular on Definitely Not the Opera, and The Debaters. In 2012 they appeared on British TV for the first time, on Morgan Spurlock's Sky Atlantic programme New Britannia.

 2013 – The Late Late Show with Craig Ferguson; CBS, US
 2012 – New Britannia; Sky Atlantic, Britain
 2012 – Melbourne International Comedy Festival Opening Night Gala for Oxfam; Channel Ten, Australia
 2011 – Funny As Hell; HBO, Canada
 2009, 2010, 2011 – Good News Week; Channel Ten, Australia
 2009 – The Comedy Network, Canada
 2007, 2014 – Last Comic Standing; NBC, US

 Solo shows 
 2013 – DeAnne Smith: Let's Do This! 2012 – DeAnne Smith: Livin' the Sweet Life 2011 – DeAnne Smith: The Best DeAnne Smith DeAnne Smith Can Be 2011 – About Freakin' Time 2010 – DeAnne Smith: BALLSY 2009 – DeAnne Smith Lacks Focus 2008 – Shouting Over Drunks Other work 

 Creator and host 
 2010–present – Happenglad's New Hat 2010–present – Freedom Nation 2008–present – Stand Up / Strip Down 2008–2010 – Tale Spin! 2005 – 2009 – Comedy OFF the Main Co-writer 
 2011 – Sarah Quinn in Other People's Problems; with Sarah Quinn and Samuel Booth

 Podcasts 
 2013–2016 – DeAnne Smith's Questionable at Best Awards 
 2012 – Edinburgh Fringe Festival – Amused Moose Top Ten; shortlisted 2011 – Canadian Comedy Awards – Best Female Stand-Up; nominated 2011 – Melbourne International Comedy Festival – Barry Award for Most Outstanding Comedy Show; nominated 2009 – Adelaide Fringe Festival – Best Established Comedian; nominated 2008 – Canadian Comedy Awards – Best Newcomer; nominated 2008 – Sydney Comedy Festival – Time Out Best Newcomer; won''

Personal life 
While hosting Comedy Up Late at the Melbourne International Comedy Festival 2017, DeAnne described themself as agender.

References

External links
 
 

1979 births
Living people
American stand-up comedians
Canadian stand-up comedians
Canadian non-binary writers
American non-binary writers
People from Endicott, New York
Non-binary comedians
Comedians from New York (state)
21st-century American comedians
21st-century Canadian comedians
American emigrants to Canada
Canadian Comedy Award winners
21st-century Canadian LGBT people
Canadian LGBT comedians
American LGBT comedians
Agender people